The 1979 PGA Tour season was played from January 11 to October 28, which marked the PGA Tour's 50th season. The season consisted of 44 official money events. Tom Watson won the most tournaments, five, and there were 11 first-time winners. The tournament results and award winners are listed below.

Schedule
The following table lists official events during the 1979 season.

Unofficial events
The following events were sanctioned by the PGA Tour, but did not carry official money, nor were wins official.

Awards

Notes

External links
PGA Tour official site
1979 season coverage at golfstats.com

PGA Tour seasons
PGA Tour